Nativity or The Nativity may refer to:

Birth of Jesus Christ
 Nativity of Jesus, the Gospel stories of the birth of Jesus Christ
 Nativity of Jesus in art, any depiction of the nativity scene
 Nativity (Campin), a 1420 panel painting by Robert Campin
 Nativity (Christus), a devotional mid-1450s oil-on-wood panel painting by Petrus Christus
 Nativity (Correggio), a painting finished around 1529–1530 by Antonio da Correggio
 Nativity (El Greco), 
 Nativity (Geertgen tot Sint Jans) or Nativity at Night, a painting of about 1490 by Geertgen tot Sint Jans
 Nativity (Lanfranco), 
 Nativity (Masaccio) or Desco da parto, a birthing-tray painted by Masaccio
 Nativity (Parmigianino), 
 Nativity (Simone dei Crocifissi), 
 The Nativity (Burne-Jones), 1888
 The Nativity (Piero della Francesca), 
 Nativity play, a play which recounts the story of the Nativity of Jesus
 Nativity scene or crèche, a three-dimensional display depicting the Nativity

Film, television, and theater
 Nativity (film series), a 2009–2018 series of British family Christmas films
 Nativity!, the 2009 first film in the series
 The Nativity (film), a 1978 American television film
 The Nativity (television drama), a 1952 American television film
 The Nativity (TV series), a 2010 British four-part drama series
 Nativity: A Life Story, a musical by Langston Hughes first staged in the mid-1990s

Other uses
 La Navidad (The Nativity), a settlement founded in 1492 by Christopher Columbus, in present-day Haiti
 Natal chart or nativity, the horoscope at or of the time of one's birth
 Nativity High School (Detroit, Michigan), former high school in Detroit, Michigan
 Nativity School (Cincinnati, Ohio), Catholic grade school in Cincinnati, Ohio

See also
 Antigen nativity, an antigen before an APC binds to it
 Birth, the act or process of bearing or bringing forth offspring
 Native (disambiguation)
 Nativity of Mary, a Catholic feast day commemorating the birth of the Virgin Mary
 Nativity of St John the Baptist, a Christian feast day celebrating the birth of John the Baptist
 Nativity of the Theotokos, Eastern Orthodox feast day commemorating the birth of the Virgin Mary
 Nativism (disambiguation)
 Navidad (disambiguation)